Bound For the Rio Grande is the second Sons of the San Joaquin album.  It was independently produced and distributed and contains songs written by or notably recorded by the Sons of the Pioneers.

Track listing

Personnel
Sons of the San Joaquin
Jack Hannah - vocals, rhythm guitar
Joe Hannah - vocals, bass fiddle
Lon Hannah - vocals, lead guitar, rhythm guitar

Additional personnel
"Doc" Denning - fiddle, occasional bass fiddle

Production
Sons of the San Joaquin - producers
Recorded at:
Maximus Recording Studios, Fresno, CA
Nye Morton - engineer, mixer
David M. Graham - photography
Lance Bowen - design

External links
Official site

1991 albums
Sons of the San Joaquin albums